James Kevin Donachie (born 14 May 1993) is an Australian soccer player who plays as a centre back for Sydney FC in the A-League.

Club career

Brisbane Roar
In 2010, he signed a youth contract with A-League club Brisbane Roar. He made his professional debut in the 2011–12 A-League season on 25 March 2012 in a round 27 clash against Gold Coast United at the Robina Stadium. Two weeks before the start of 2012–13 A-League Donachie signed a three-year senior contract with Brisbane.

In June 2016 it was announced that Donachie would become a free agent. He was able to leave earlier than anticipated by Brisbane Roar due to an error by the club in the dates stipulated in his contract.

Melbourne Victory
On 11 June 2016 Donachie signed for Melbourne Victory for the 2016–17 A-League season. On 19 June 2018, it was announced that Melbourne Victory failed to keep Donachie at the club and he departed to join Korean club Jeonnam Dragons.

On 31 January 2019, Donachie rejoined the Victory on loan for the remainder of the 2018–19 A-League season.

On 16 August 2019, Donachie signed a one-year contract with the Victory.

Newcastle Jets

On 24 August 2020, Donachie signed a three-year contract  with the jets.

Loan to Goa
On 26 September 2020, Donachie joined Goa on a one-year loan deal from Newcastle Jets. He has also represented the club at the 2021 AFC Champions League where they finished on third in the group stages.

After returning to Newcastle Jets from loan at Goa, Donachie's contract was mutually terminated.

Sydney FC
On 16 July 2021, Donachie joined Sydney FC on a one-year contract.

Career statistics

International
In June 2012, Donachie was named in the Young Socceroos squad for the AFC U-22 Qualifiers.

Honours

Club
Melbourne Victory
 A-League Championship: 2017–18

Individual
 National Youth League Player of the Year: 2010–11, 2011–12

References

External links

1993 births
Australian soccer players
A-League Men players
Brisbane Roar FC players
Melbourne Victory FC players
Newcastle Jets FC players
FC Goa players
Sydney FC players
Jeonnam Dragons players
Association football defenders
Living people
Australian expatriate sportspeople in India
Soccer players from Brisbane
Expatriate footballers in India
Indian Super League players
Australian expatriate soccer players
Australia youth international soccer players
Expatriate footballers in South Korea
K League players
Australian expatriate sportspeople in South Korea